Tristram's bunting (Emberiza tristrami) is a bird in the family Emberizidae. The species was first described by Robert Swinhoe in 1870.

It breeds in eastern Manchuria and the Russian Far East and winters in central and southern China.

It is accidental in Japan, Korea, Laos, Myanmar, Russia, Mongolia, Taiwan, Thailand, Vietnam and north-eastern India. Its natural habitat is boreal forests.

References

Tristram's bunting
Birds of Manchuria
Tristram's bunting
Taxonomy articles created by Polbot